Karting at the 2018 Summer Youth Olympics was held on 13 October. The events took place at the Kartodromo in the Autodromo Juan y Oscar Galvez in Buenos Aires, Argentina.
The exhibition event was part of the Youth Olympics with the intention that the activity is part of the 2024 Summer Olympics in Paris. All electric karting were piloted by men and women.

Six teams - each run by a boy and girl - participated in the event with a practice and qualifying session scheduled ahead of the race. The pair of Franco Colapinto and María García Puig won the race from pole position.

Event 
The karting event was presented at the Green Park, by the president of FIA Jean Todt and by the president of the IOC Thomas Bach, on October 5. The event was presented within the program 3500LIVES of the FIA.

Results

References

External links
 http://www.e-kart.com.ar/NoticiasDet.asp?Param=18049&Op=805
 http://carburando.com/notas/argentina-en-un-momento-historico-del-automovilismo-mundial

2018 Summer Youth Olympics events